Mkandawire is a surname of African origin.

List of people with the surname 

 Daniel Mkandawire (born 1951), Malawian former high jumper and triple jumper
 Donton Samuel Mkandawire (died 2011), Malawian politician, educator and diplomat
 Judge Mkandawire (born 1986), Zambian football striker
 Levy Mkandawire (1961–2021), Zambian politician
 Noel Mkandawire (1978–2017), Malawian football player
 Tamika Mkandawire (born 1983), Malawian-born English former professional footballer
 Thandika Mkandawire (1940–2020), Malawian economist
 Wambali Mkandawire (1952–2021), Malawian jazz singer and activist
 Yafet Mkandawire, Malawian Presbyterian

See also 

 Mandawara

Surnames
Surnames of African origin
Malawian surnames
Zambian surnames